Jaryszów is a village in the administrative district of Gmina Ujazd, within Strzelce County, Opole Voivodeship, in south-western Poland.

The oldest known mention of Jaryszów dates back to 1265, when it was part of the Piast-ruled fragmented Poland. Its name comes from the Old Polish male name Jaromir, Jarosław or Jarysz. Between 1871 and 1945 it was part of Germany. In the final stages of World War II, in January 1945, the Germans executed a group of prisoners of the Auschwitz concentration camp in the village.

Jaryszów's landmark is the medieval church of the Assumption.

References

Villages in Strzelce County